Rani Kamalapati is a suburb in Bhopal, India, in the BHEL township in the city of Bhopal. It is notable for the Rani Kamalapati Railway Station,  the second busiest station in the city after the Bhopal Junction. This railway station was "reconstructed on the lines of Germany’s Heidelberg railway station" as part of a public–private partnership at a cost of 1billion Indian rupees, (about $13.4 million). Rani Kamalapati railway station says that it is India's first world class railway station. Rani Kamalapati also houses the divisional headquarter of "Bhopal Division" of west central railways.

Etymology

In Hindustani, Habibganj means The Lovely City. This name was given by the Begum of Bhopal, when she was greatly influenced by the greenery and water resources of Bhopal City.

Transport

By rail
Rani Kamalapati Railway Station a privately owned railway station serves the area. The station is the headquarters of the Shaan - E - Bhopal Express (The pride of Bhopal). Besides the Bhopal Express, there are 12 trains, having a starting and termination point at Habibganj.

References

Neighbourhoods in Bhopal